Secret Spheres of Art is the third studio album by Serbian heavy metal band Alogia, released in 2005.

The album features Alogia's old songs rerecorded with English language lyrics. It was released through Spanish record label Locomotive Music.

Track listing
"Secret Sphere" - 6:08
"Journey into the Dawn of Life" - 1:00
"Politics of War" - 4:03
"Legend of a Stolen Heart" - 3:28
"Falling Asleep" - 4:45
"Kontinuum" - 2:10
"Mystica Aegyptiorum" - 0:57
"Amon" - 3:32
"Beyond the Time" - 3:28
"Lament" - 4:28
"Astral Horizons" - 0:51
"As the Time Passes by" - 3:43
"Overture Soleminis" - 1:41
"Samson" - 3:35

Bonus tracks
"What a Feeling" - 3:19

Personnel
Nikola Mijić - vocals
Srđan Branković - guitar
Miroslav Branković - guitar
Ivan Vasić - bass guitar
Branislav Dabić - keyboards
Vladimir Đedović - keyboards
Damir Adžić - drums

References

External links
Secret Spheres of Art at Encyclopaedia Metallum

Alogia (band) albums
2005 albums
Locomotive Music albums